Christopher Nolan (born 1970) is an English-American film director, writer and producer.

Chris or Christopher Nolan may also refer to:

Chris Nolan (hurler) (born 1998), Irish hurler
Christopher Nolan (author) (1965–2009), Irish poet and author
Chris Nolan, Australian musician, founding member of the band Hush